Palermo is the principal city and administrative seat of Sicily, Italy.

Palermo may also refer to:

Places 
Palermo, Buenos Aires, neighborhood of the Argentine capital, Buenos Aires
Palermo (Buenos Aires Underground), a railway station
Palermo, Ontario, former village merged into the town of Oakville, Ontario, Canada
Palermo, Huila, a town in Colombia
Palermo, California
Palermo, Kansas
Palermo, Maine
Palermo, New York
Palermo, North Dakota
Palermo, Uruguay, town in the department of Florida, Uruguay
Palermo, Montevideo, neighborhood of the Uruguayan capital, Montevideo
Province of Palermo, where the Sicilian city of Palermo is located
Parque Palermo

Other uses 
Palermo (surname), including a list of people with the name.
Palermo's Pizza, pizza company from Milwaukee, Wisconsin
Palermo (film), 1937 Argentine film
U.S. Città di Palermo, Italian football team which currently plays in Serie B
Palermo Stone, archaeological find held by Regional Archeological Museum in the city of Palermo, Sicily
Palermo Technical Impact Hazard Scale
 Palermo, character of the Netflix television show Money Heist roled by Rodrigo de la Serna